On July 4, 2022, a mass shooting occurred during an Independence Day parade in Highland Park, Illinois, United States. The shooting occurred at 10:14a.m. CDT (UTC−05:00), roughly 15 minutes after the parade had started. Seven people were killed, and 48 others were wounded by bullets or shrapnel.

Authorities apprehended 21 year old Robert Eugene Crimo III more than eight hours after the shooting and charged him the next day with seven counts of first-degree murder. On July 27, the charges were upgraded to 21 counts of first-degree murder, 48 counts of attempted murder, and 48 counts of aggravated battery.

Background 
The city held a Fourth of July celebration, which included a parade that began at 10:00a.m. CDT (UTC−05:00). The parade started at the intersection of Laurel and St. Johns Avenues, headed north on St. Johns Avenue, then turned west on Central Avenue, and continued to Sunset Park.

According to the Los Angeles Times, "A 2020 study by Brandeis University and the University of Chicago found Highland Park had among the Chicago region's highest concentrations of Jewish residents." The neighboring suburb of Highwood is home to a large Hispanic population.

Events

Shooting 
The shooting began at 10:14a.m. in downtown Highland Park, with the shooter firing a rifle from the rooftop of the Ross Cosmetics building, a local store on the northwest corner of Central Avenue and 2nd Street. The gunman had gained access to the elevated position by using an unsecured ladder attached to the building.

The shooter used a Smith & Wesson M&P15 semiautomatic rifle with three 30-round magazines. A total of 83 shots were fired. Victims included spectators and some of those marching in the parade. At least one parade attendee provided medical treatment to those injured, before first responders arrived. Footage shot by Chicago Sun-Times reporter Lynn Sweet, a spectator at the parade, shows a participating klezmer band on a float continuing to play as gunfire began, and many attendees running while screaming. Additional photos of the scene were captured by attendees and posted to social media.

Manhunt and suspect's capture 
Over 100 law enforcement officers from multiple agencies responded to the shooting. The shooter ceased firing as law enforcement officers approached the building, causing the shooter to flee the scene and evade immediate capture. During his escape, the rifle Crimo used fell from his bag and was recovered by police within minutes. He then drove to the Madison, Wisconsin area, with a Kel-Tec SUB-2000 semiautomatic rifle in his car. He considered attacking another Independence Day celebration in Madison, but decided against it. He discarded his cell phone in Middleton, Wisconsin.

A driver from Waukegan and his passengers spotted Crimo's damaged 2010 Honda Fit on the southbound U.S Route 41 near Wadsworth. Over the next 13 minutes, they relayed information to 911 operators. Crimo was stopped by North Chicago Police and Lake County Sheriff units at the intersection of U.S Route 41 and Westleigh Road in Lake Forest, Illinois, and apprehended at approximately 6:30p.m., more than eight hours after the shooting began.

Victims  

Seven people were killed, and 48 others were injured by either bullets or shrapnel during the attack. Five of the victims—all adults—died at the scene, and two died at the hospital.

Mexican authorities have said two men killed at the parade were "natives of the country." One of these was a 78-year-old Mexican grandfather who was visiting family in the area, and another was a 69-year-old man. Two Jewish victims that were killed were a 63-year-old woman and an 88-year-old grandfather. Another was a 64-year-old mother of two. Of the others that were killed, two victims were a married couple in their 30s who attended the parade with their 2-year-old son, who survived, and was found wandering unaccompanied.

The shooting victims ranged in age from 8 to 88 years old. Highland Park Hospital reported that they were treating 26 people after the shooting, 25 being gunshot wounds, with five later transferred to Evanston Hospital. Additionally, four of the injured were transported to Glenbrook Hospital, and several others were taken to hospitals outside of the Northshore University Medical System network.

Investigation 

Highland Park authorities collaborated with the FBI, Illinois State Police, and Chicago Police during the investigation and manhunt. The police believe only one shooter was involved and the shooting was described as appearing to be "very random (and) very intentional". After his arrest, Crimo's home in Highwood, a small suburb just north of Highland Park, was raided by FBI agents.

Lake County police alleged that Crimo planned the attack for weeks, and that he dressed in women's clothing and hid his facial tattoos in order to flee the scene after the attack, among panicked parade-goers. Mayor of Highland Park Nancy Rotering said that she believed that the weapon used in the crime was obtained legally. Police seized three rifles, one shotgun, and one handgun from Crimo.

Crimo's motives remain unclear. The London-based Institute for Strategic Dialogue said it appeared Crimo’s extensive online presence contained posts that gravitated toward far-right and neo-fascist ideologies. A Highland Park rabbi stated that, three months before the shooting, Crimo had entered Central Avenue Synagogue, a Chabad house, during the Passover Seder and was asked to leave. The Chabad House is located two blocks from where the July 4 shooting occurred. However, investigators have determined no racial or religious motivation for the shooting. Michael Masters, national director and CEO of the Secure Community Network headquartered in Chicago, said, "Nothing overtly we have identified in his social media posts says this was an antisemitic attack, but we are coordinating with law enforcement. Apparently on social media, there are some indications he was ideating around the Fourth of July for some period of time, which would indicate this was not an attack on one particular community."

According to experts on QAnon and conspiracy theory movements, Crimo's social media diet, while extreme, was distinct from the realm of QAnon. Mike Rothschild, an author who has written on QAnon, said, "[T]he world Crimo lived in was pretty far off Q. He was in a 4chan bubble of ironic Nazi and anime memes, fascist-inspired music, and mass shooter ideation that basically consumes nothing but irony and sadness."

Legal proceedings 
Robert Eugene  (born September 20, 2000) was charged on July 5 with seven counts of first-degree murder. The next day, he confessed to the shooting. Lake County Sheriff's Office said that he is being held without bail. A preliminary hearing was scheduled for July 28, 2022, but the hearing was obviated when a Lake County, Illinois grand jury indicted Crimo on July 27, 2022. Crimo was indicted on 117 felony counts: 21 counts of first-degree murder, three for each deceased victim; along with 48 counts of attempted murder and 48 counts of aggravated battery for each victim struck by a bullet or shrapnel.

Accused 

Crimo attended Highland Park High School, but dropped out before his junior year. He has performed under the stage name "Awake the Rapper", and posted his albums on Spotify, YouTube and Apple Music; which included apparent references to the QAnon conspiracy theory. Music videos by him on YouTube depicted mass shootings and characters being shot by police. One video was accompanied by the narration "I need to just do it. It is my destiny." The account is no longer available. 

Crimo frequently visited an online message board that discussed graphic depictions of death. He posted a video of a beheading the week before the shooting. He had his own Discord server, which was invaded by 4chan users after the shooting and has since been shut down. Stephen Harrison of Slate speculated he had used a single-purpose account on the English Wikipedia in an unsuccessful attempt to create an article about himself in 2017 and 2018. An account with the same username created articles about Crimo on the Fandom sites Wikitubia and the Rap Wiki. 

A voluble supporter of former President Donald Trump, Crimo frequented far-right gatherings, often wearing Where's Waldo garb, and confrontationally joined counterprotests.

Police records and people who knew Crimo indicate that Crimo came from a troubled household. When Crimo was two, his mother left him unattended on a hot August day inside a car with windows rolled up. She pleaded guilty to child endangerment and was ordered to undergo an evaluation at a child advocacy center. Between 2009 and 2014, police officers visited the Crimos' home nearly 20 times, nine of which involved reports of domestic violence. In 2010, Crimo's father reported that his wife struck him with a screwdriver but later retracted the accusation. Officers recommended that the couple go through marriage counseling or separate. Crimo's parents no longer live together.

Law enforcement identified two prior encounters with Crimo: a 911 call in April 2019 reporting that he attempted to commit suicide and a September 2019 incident regarding alleged threats by Crimo to a family member. According to law enforcement, mental health professionals handled the suicide matter. In September 2019, police seized 16 knives, a dagger, and a sword from Crimo after a family member reported to the police that he planned to "kill everyone". Crimo's father said the weapons were his, however, and both parents denied Crimo had threatened anyone. He was not charged with a crime at the time, but a “clear and present danger report” was filed with the Illinois State Police. In December that year, Crimo applied for a Firearm Owner Identification card (FOID). It was sponsored by his father due to his young age. On either occasion, Highland Park police could have invoked Illinois' red flag law, which would have allowed them to seek a restraining order preventing Crimo from buying guns for up to six months. However, they did not pursue this option. Just four months later, in January 2020, Illinois State Police approved Crimo for a firearms permit, and he passed four background checks when buying firearms in 2020 and 2021. When asked about why the "clear and present danger" report did not prevent Crimo from obtaining a FOID card, the Illinois State Police said that Crimo responded no when asked whether he would harm himself or others and "no one, including family, was willing to move forward on a complaint". Neither did they provide more information on threats or mental health that would have enabled further action by law enforcement.

Crimo III's father
Crimo's father, 58-year-old Robert Bob Crimo Jr., who lived with the accused suspect, said that there had been "no warning signs" immediately before the shooting. He stated that he does not regret sponsoring his son for an Illinois FOID card that allowed his son to legally purchase weapons even after incidents that raised red flags with police. Crimo Jr. described the entire situation as a nightmare, saying the family is shocked at the behavior because he believes his son was raised with good morals. He told the New York Post the day after the shooting that his son talked about the 2022 Copenhagen mall shooting and the 22-year-old Danish suspect the night before allegedly launching his own massacre and how Crimo Jr. avoided taking any responsibility or feeling guilt over how the suspect got his gun.

Robert Bob Crimo Jr. (born June 22, 1964) is a local Highland Park resident who also grew up in Highwood and Buffalo Grove, a popular local deli owner, and a former mayoral Republican for the city who ended up losing to pro-gun control Democrat Nancy Rotering in the 2019 runoff election. He lived with his wife and Highland Park native Denise Crimo, who had a criminal history dating back as far as mid-2002. Prior to his mayoral campaign, he owned and operated two restaurants in the city of Highland Park. Crimo Jr. first operated "White Hen Pantry" for 17 years from 1990 until its closure in 2007, and a 7-Eleven was currently at the former Deli's site. The following year in 2008, Crimo Jr. opened and operated "Bob's Pantry & Deli", which is a local favorite by thousands in the city since opening and was notable enough for its "Nicky D" sandwiches. 

On December 16, 2022, Crimo Jr. was arrested and charged with seven counts of reckless conduct in relation to the shooting without incident. The Lake County State’s Attorney Eric Rinehart said that Robert Crimo Jr. surrendered to Highwood Police and determined that the charges are based on Crimo sponsoring his then-19-year-old son’s application for a gun license shortly after losing the city's mayoral runoff election in 2019. The following morning on December 17, Crimo Jr. was released on $50,000 bond.

On February 16, 2023, Crimo Jr. entered a not-guilty plea to the charges involving the 2019 acquirement of his son's gun license.

Aftermath 

Multiple Chicago suburbs canceled their Fourth of July celebrations after the shooting. Six Flags Great America in Gurnee continued operating but canceled its fireworks show. The Chicago White Sox announced they would continue to play their baseball game against the Minnesota Twins but canceled their fireworks show.

School districts in the surrounding neighborhoods said counseling service would be made available at Highland Park High School for "students, staff and community members."

The Ravinia Festival in Highland Park announced the cancellation of all concerts and events through July 10. "This decision was made after careful consideration and in close consultation with many stakeholders, including neighbors, public officials, artists, and patrons. Our shared hope is that the reduced activity—both within the park and in the neighborhoods surrounding Ravinia—will give the community the space and quiet to reflect and heal."

A GoFundMe campaign was established to benefit the two-year-old who was orphaned. By July 7, nearly $3 million had been raised.

Members of the North Chicago Police Department were honored on July 18 for their role in capturing Crimo. The North Chicago City Council presented six officers and one detective with letters of commendation.

The Small Business Administration is offering low interest loans to small businesses and nonprofits in Lake County, Cook County, McHenry County, and Kenosha County that may have suffered economic setbacks because of the shooting.

With the city's blessings, the Highland Park Community Foundation also offered grants to the victims and to nonprofit organizations helping those affected.

The shooting caused renewed interest in banning assault weapons in Illinois. An "assault weapons ban" bill was signed into law on January 10, 2023, banning many rifles considered to be assault weapons. This bill also included magazine capacity restrictions for rifles (10 rounds) and handguns (15 rounds), alongside many other provisions. People who own any weapon considered an assault weapon before the bill was passed have to register it with the Illinois State Police within 300 days of the bill being signed.

Reactions 
Crimo's parents released a statement through their attorney, stating: "We are all mothers and fathers, sisters and brothers, and this is a terrible tragedy for many families, the victims, the paradegoers, the community, and our own. Our hearts, thoughts, and prayers go out to everybody."

President Joe Biden stated that he was shocked by the "senseless" gun violence and has offered the "full support of the Federal government" to the affected communities. He also called for gun control measures. Vice President Kamala Harris made a similar statement.

Illinois governor J. B. Pritzker called the perpetrator a "monster" and stated that his office had made available all state resources to the community and was coordinating with local officials. He called for better gun control as well. Illinois U.S. Senator Dick Durbin called the attack "horrific" and "senseless". Gubernatorial candidate Darren Bailey advocated for "prayer and action to address rampant crime and mental health issues," calling the attack a "horrific tragedy". Bailey later apologized after saying, "...so let's pray for justice to prevail, and then let's move on and let's celebrate..." about 90 minutes after the shooting.

Highland Park Mayor Nancy Rotering said the community had been shaken to its core. Chicago mayor Lori Lightfoot released a statement about the shooting, calling it devastating and that she had been in contact with Mayor Rotering and offered the city's support with the Chicago Police Department providing assistance. She also stated the city grieved with the families of victims and the injured.

Illinois State Senator Julie Morrison and U.S. Representative Brad Schneider were in attendance and expressed their condolences. Morrison expressed a sentiment that she would never want to be in another parade. Schneider stated he and his campaign team were safe and highlighted his commitment to make the community a safer place.

See also 

 List of mass shootings in the United States in 2022

Notes

References

External links
 

2022 active shooter incidents in the United States
2022 in Illinois
2022 mass shootings in the United States
2020s crimes in Illinois
Attacks on parades
Deaths by firearm in Illinois
July 2022 crimes in the United States
Mass shootings in Illinois
Mass shootings in the United States
Highland Park, Illinois